Frederick William Freemantle (27 June 1871 – 12 September 1943) was an English first-class cricketer. He was a left-handed batsman and a fast-medium bowler, although which arm he used to bowl is unknown.

Freemantle made his first-class debut for Hampshire in 1900 against Kent. His final first-class match for Hampshire came in the same season against Leicestershire.

Freemantle died in Houghton, Hampshire on 12 September 1943.

External links
Frederick Freemantle at Cricinfo
Frederick Freemantle at CricketArchive

1871 births
1943 deaths
People from St Mary Bourne
English cricketers
Hampshire cricketers